Jonathan Rowell may refer to:

 Jonathan H. Rowell (1833-1908), former U.S. Representative
 Jonny Rowell, Jonathan 'Jonny' Rowell (born 1989), English footballer